Mary O'Connor Donohue (born March 22, 1947) is an American retired educator, attorney, politician and Judge of the New York Court of Claims and a former two-term Lieutenant Governor of New York. Donohue was first elected lieutenant governor in 1998, and was re-elected in 2002.

Teaching and legal career
Donohue is a former teacher and lawyer who was once an aide to State Senate Majority Leader Joseph Bruno.  She graduated from The College of New Rochelle and received a master's degree in Education from Russell Sage College. In 1983, she received a Juris Doctor degree from Albany Law School.

In addition to working for Bruno, Donohue served as an Assistant County Attorney in Rensselaer County. During her time in the county attorney's office, she worked on Family Court and juvenile justice issues.

District attorney and justice of the Supreme Court
Donohue served as the district attorney of Rensselaer County for several years in the 1990s. During her two terms as district attorney, she prosecuted over 5,000 cases a year. She handled several cases herself. In 1996, she was elected as a justice of the New York State Supreme Court. Serving as a state judge, Donohue handled both civil and criminal cases. She resigned from her judgeship in 1998, when Pataki picked her as a running mate.

Lieutenant Governor
Donohue was selected as the running mate to Gov. George Pataki in his 1998 re-election bid. After she and Gov. Pataki won their 1998 election, Donohue was sworn in as Lieutenant Governor of New York on January 1, 1999, replacing Betsy McCaughey Ross.

School violence
When Donohue became lieutenant governor, Gov. Pataki appointed her to head a special task force on school violence issues. Gov. Pataki said that he designated Donohue to head the task force because of her background as a teacher and district attorney. According to her state website, Donohue spent a year traveling the state meeting with teachers, parents, students, and law enforcement to discuss school violence issues. As a part of her work, Donohue formulated a series of recommendations, signed into law by Pataki in 2000.

Since 1999, Donohue started to spend time traveling the state promoting school violence prevention and to implement the recommendations of her task force. In 2005, Donohue led a state program, comprising several agencies, to determine best practices in the area of school violence prevention. Part of the recommendations made by Donohue's task force included giving teacher authority to have disruptive students removed from classrooms, creating character education curricula in school districts, and making violence against a teacher in a classroom a felony.

Quality communities
In 2000, Pataki appointed Donohue to chair a task force on quality communities in New York. Donohue's task force met around the state to discuss land use policies, economic development, and growth issues. The panel issued 41 recommendations on preserving community character statewide. After the conclusion of the task force, Donohue served as Chairwoman of the Quality Communities Working Group, which oversaw implementation of the task force's recommendations and the awarding of quality communities grants to towns statewide.

According to the website for the Quality Communities Clearinghouse, Donohue's panel made recommendations in the areas of neighborhood preservation, open space conservation, farmland preservation, economic development, land use planning, transportation, and technology. Donohue has traveled the state hosting roundtable discussion on quality communities issues since 2000. In that role, she worked with Secretaries of State Alexander Treadwell, Randy Daniels, and Christopher Jacobs on local government issues.

Small business, aging, homeland security, and criminal justice
In 2001, Donohue chaired a task force on small business issues in the state. In that role, she met with small business owners and developed policy recommendations for governor on these issues. During her second term, Donohue frequently traveled the state promoting homeland security issues, drunk driving prevention, and criminal justice.

In 2005, Donohue was named by Pataki as the Chairwoman of the New York State Delegation to the White House Conference on Aging. Before the conference, Donohue held a series of community meetings around the state on aging issues.

Statewide campaigns

1998

In 1997, Pataki announced that he was dropping Lt. Gov. Betsy McCaughey Ross from his 1998 reelection ticket. Pataki and McCaughey Ross had feuded for much of his term. McCaughey Ross would later become a Democrat and run unsuccessfully for governor in 1998.

Following Pataki's announcement regarding McCaughey Ross, Donohue was reported as a possible replacement running mate. In addition, State Parks Commissioner Bernadette Castro, State Senator Mary Lou Rath and Erie County Comptroller Nancy Naples were reported as possible running mates. In the spring of 1998, Pataki announced his selection of Donohue.

In the 1998 general election, the Pataki-Donohue ticket defeated the Democratic ticket of New York City Council Speaker Peter Vallone for governor and Brighton Town Supervisor Sandra Frankel for lieutenant governor.

2002
In 2002, there were reports that Donohue was being pushed out by Pataki as his running mate. The reports said that either Secretary of State Randy Daniels or Erie County Executive Joel Giambra would replace her on the Pataki ticket. Donohue beat back the challenge. There were reports that she was offered the Republican nomination for state attorney general to challenge Eliot Spitzer in 2002 so that she would not seek re-election. She declined the nomination, which went to Judge Dora Irizarry instead.

In September 2002 Donohue and Pataki fought to win the nomination of the New York State Independence Party. Donohue won her primary, but Pataki lost to Rochester businessman Tom Golisano. This made Donohue both the running mate of Pataki and Golisano in the November election and made her the officeholder who won the most votes in New York State in 2002.

The Pataki/Donohue ticket defeated the Democratic ticket of State Comptroller Carl McCall for governor and businessman Dennis Mehiel for lieutenant governor.

2006
After Pataki announced in 2005 that he would not seek reelection, Donohue was seen as a possible candidate for governor. However, she later announced that she would not run for office in 2006 either.

Federal judgeship nomination
On March 3, 2006, Donohue informed reporters that her name had been submitted by Pataki to President George W. Bush for nomination to a United States District Court judgeship in Upstate New York.  On June 27, 2006, the White House announced that Donohue has been nominated to the judgeship. Her nomination went to the US Senate for confirmation, where it was not brought up by the Senate Judiciary Committee before the 109th Congress adjourned on December 10, 2006. Senator Charles Schumer indicated that he did not see Donohue's nomination being able to be confirmed by the Senate in the 110th Congress, when the Democrats have the Senate majority.

State Court of Claims

On December 13, 2006, Pataki nominated her to a seat as a Judge of the New York Court of Claims.  She was confirmed that day by the State Senate for term expiring in March 2015. Court of Claims Judges preside over lawsuits against the State of New York and various independent state agencies. She took office as a judge after her term as lieutenant governor expired at midnight on December 31, 2006. She retired from the Court of Claims in May, 2009.

State tickets with Donohue
1998 NYS Republican and Conservative Party Tickets
Governor: George Pataki
Lieutenant Governor: Mary Donohue
Comptroller: Bruce Blakeman
Attorney General: Dennis Vacco
U.S. Senate: Al D'Amato

2002 NYS Republican and Conservative Party Tickets
Governor: George Pataki
Lieutenant Governor: Mary Donohue
Comptroller: John Faso
Attorney General: Dora Irizarry

2002 NYS Independence Party Ticket
Governor: B. Thomas Golisano
Lieutenant Governor: Mary Donohue
Comptroller: John Faso
Attorney General: Eliot Spitzer

Electoral history
2002 race for governor and lieutenant governor
George Pataki and Mary Donohue (R) (inc.), 49%
Carl McCall and Dennis Mehiel (D), 34%
Tom Golisano and Mary Donohue (I), 14%
2002 Independence Party primary for lieutenant governor
Mary Donohue (inc.), 64%
William J. Neild, 36%
1998 Race for governor and lieutenant governor
George Pataki and Mary Donohue (R) (inc.), 54%
Peter Vallone and Sandra Frankel (D), 33%
Tom Golisano and Laureen Oliver (I), 8%
Betsy McCaughey Ross and Jonathan C. Reiter (L), 1.4%

See also
List of female lieutenant governors in the United States

References

Albany Law School alumni
American women lawyers
American lawyers
American women judges
Russell Sage College alumni
College of New Rochelle alumni
Rensselaer County district attorneys
Lieutenant Governors of New York (state)
Living people
New York (state) lawyers
New York (state) Republicans
New York (state) state court judges
Women in New York (state) politics
People from Brunswick, New York
Politicians from Troy, New York
1947 births